Pyrausta ostrinalis, also called the scarce purple and gold, is a species of moth of the family Crambidae. It was described by Jacob Hübner in 1796 and is found in Europe and North Africa.

The wingspan is 15–21 mm. It is very similar to Pyrausta purpuralis  but ostrinalis has a narrower forewing and the yellow markings are paler. There are slight differences in the underside wing pattern.

References

External links
 Pyrausta ostrinalis at UKMoths

ostrinalis
Moths of Europe
Moths of Africa
Moths described in 1796